Gunnar Eide (1 May 1923 – 11 September 1994) was a Norwegian footballer. He played in one match for the Norway national football team in 1952.

References

External links
 
 

1923 births
1994 deaths
Norwegian footballers
Norway international footballers
Sportspeople from Stavanger
Association football midfielders
Sarpsborg FK players